The anacoustic zone, also known as the zone of silence, is the region of the atmosphere of Earth above about  where the air density becomes so low that air molecules are not close enough to support transmission of sound waves within the hearing range.

As altitude increases through the atmosphere, the first sound waves to disappear are the high pitched, high-frequency (short wavelength) ones. At a certain altitude (roughly ) even the lowest frequency tone that can be heard by a human being (around 20 Hz) no longer can be transmitted.

With increasing height, the atmosphere becomes more rarefied, which increases the mean time between collisions of molecules (also known as mean free time). The maximum frequency a sound wave can have and still be able to propagate in a gas is roughly the inverse of the mean free time (molecular mean free path divided by average molecular speed). Hence the more rarefied a gas medium, the lower is the cut-off frequency for sound propagation in that medium.

References

Atmosphere of Earth